Aleksandr Aleksandrovich Andronov (Moscow – October 31, 1952, Gorky) was a Soviet physicist and member of the Soviet Academy of Sciences (1946). He worked extensively on the theory of stability of dynamical systems, introducing (together with Lev Pontryagin) the notion of structural stability. In that context, he also contributed to the mathematical theory of self-oscillation (a term that he coined) by establishing a link between the generation of oscillations and the theory of Lyapunov stability. He developed the comprehensive theory of self-oscillations by linking it with the qualitative theory of differential equations, topology, and with the general theory of stability of motion. The crater Andronov on the Moon is named after him.

References

External links 
 
 Author profile in the database zbMATH 

20th-century Russian scientists
Russian physicists
Soviet physicists
1901 births
1952 deaths
Full Members of the USSR Academy of Sciences
Scientists from Moscow